Tiel is a railway station located in Tiel, Netherlands. The station opened on 1 November 1882 and is on the Elst–Dordrecht railway. Train services are operated by Nederlandse Spoorwegen and Arriva.

The station is the end of the electrified line from Geldermalsen. The line to Elst remains non-electrified.

Train services

Bus services

External links

NS website 
Dutch Public Transport journey planner 

Railway stations in Gelderland
Railway stations opened in 1882
Tiel